Nekrasovka is a rural locality (a selo) in Kardonovsky Selsoviet, Kizlyarsky District, Republic of Dagestan, Russia. The population was 686 as of 2010. There are 2 streets.

Geography 
Nekrasovka is located 20 km east of Kizlyar (the district's administrative centre) by road. Kokhanovskoye and Novonadezhdovka are the nearest rural localities.

Nationalities 
Dargins, Russians, Avars, Laks and Lezgins live there.

References 

Rural localities in Kizlyarsky District